Justice Whitman may refer to:

Bernard C. Whitman (1827–1885), associate justice of the Supreme Court of Nevada
Ezekiel Whitman (1776–1866), chief justice of the Maine Supreme Judicial Court
Henry C. Whitman (1819–1889), member of the Ohio Supreme Court Commission of 1876